Andrew Bell was a Scottish amateur football wing half who played in the Scottish League for Queen's Park.

References

Scottish footballers
Scottish Football League players
Queen's Park F.C. players
Place of birth missing
Year of birth missing
Year of death missing
Association football wing halves
Troon F.C. players
Scotland amateur international footballers